Three Songs About Lenin (1934) is a documentary sound film by Ukrainian-Russian filmmaker Dziga Vertov. It is based on three admiring songs sung by anonymous people in Soviet Russia about Vladimir Ilyich Lenin. It is made up of 3 episodes and is 57 minutes long.

In 1969 it was re-edited by Elizaveta Svilova, Ilya Kopalin and Serafima Pumpyanskaya as part of the 1970 Lenin centenary.

The songs in the film 
The film opens with some texts on Lenin, and then continue with three episodes. The first episode opens with the music from the second movement of Beethoven's piano sonata Pathétique, adapted for orchestra. It then moves to the first song My face was in a gloomy prison. The first episode lasts about 19 minutes. The second episode opens with the third movement (funeral march) of Chopin's piano sonata in b-flat minor, adapted for orchestra. In the middle section of the second song, Vertov uses Wagner's Siegfried's Funeral March in Götterdämmerung, the last installment of Der Ring des Nibelungen. The third song In a big city made of stone, where Tchaikovsky's Waltz of the Flowers is used.

Home media 
This film was restored and released in home media (BD and DVD) by Flicker Alley and Eureka.

References

External links 
 
 

1934 documentary films
1934 films
Films directed by Dziga Vertov
Soviet silent feature films
Films about Vladimir Lenin
Soviet documentary films
Black-and-white documentary films
Articles containing video clips
Soviet black-and-white films